The First Treaty of Brömsebro was agreed upon in September 1541. It was an agreement between the two arch enemies Denmark-Norway and Sweden. The kings of the two countries, Christian III and Gustav I respectively, took part of the negotiations that took place in Brömsebro, a village on the border between the countries. The treaty would run for 50 years and with the treaty, Denmark-Norway and Sweden agreed upon a joined attitude against the Hanseatic League. The parties also committed to providing support when the other country was attacked by domestic or foreign enemies, which meant that Danish troops, for example, helped the Swedish king Gustav to suppress a peasant uprising (the Dacke War) the following years.

Notes

See also
Second Treaty of Brömsebro (1645)
List of treaties

Treaties of Sweden
Treaties of Denmark–Norway
1541 in Denmark
1541 in Norway
1541 in Sweden
1541 treaties
Gustav I of Sweden
Christian III of Denmark